Minuscule 738 (in the Gregory-Aland numbering), Θε43 (von Soden), is a Greek minuscule manuscript of the New Testament written on paper. It is dated by a colophon to 1327 CE. The manuscript has complex contents. Scrivener labelled it as 756e.

Description 

The codex contains the text of the Gospel of Matthew and Gospel of Luke on 81 paper leaves (size ). One leaf was supplied by a later hand. The text is written in one column per page, 34-41 lines per page.

There is no another division according to the smaller Ammonian Sections, with a references to the Eusebian Canons.

It has a commentary of Theophylact.

Text 

Aland the Greek text of the codex did not place in any Category.

It was not examined by the Claremont Profile Method.

History 

According to the colophon the manuscript was written in 1327.

The manuscript was added to the list of New Testament manuscripts by Scrivener (756) and Gregory (738). It was examined and described by Paulin Martin. Gregory saw the manuscript in 1885.

The manuscript is now housed at the Bibliothèque nationale de France (Gr. 205) in Paris.

See also 

 List of New Testament minuscules
 Biblical manuscript
 Textual criticism

References

Further reading 

 

Greek New Testament minuscules
14th-century biblical manuscripts
Bibliothèque nationale de France collections